La Guijarrosa is a municipality located in the Province of Córdoba, in the autonomous community of Andalusia, Spain.

It was an independent local entity within the municipality of Santaella, until 2018 when it was constituted as an independent municipality.

References

Municipalities in the Province of Córdoba (Spain)